Norman Vale, also known as the Nott House, is a historic home located at Guilderland in Albany County, New York.  It is a three-part home comprising a -story center section with a steeply pitched roof, flanked by -story wings.  It was built about 1790 and owned by members of the Nott family until 1977.  In the 1930s, the house was remodeled in the Colonial Revival style.

It was listed on the National Register of Historic Places in 2009.

References

Houses on the National Register of Historic Places in New York (state)
Colonial Revival architecture in New York (state)
Houses completed in 1790
Houses in Albany County, New York
National Register of Historic Places in Albany County, New York